Cowboy del amor is a 2005 documentary film directed by Michèle Ohayon.

Plot
Ivan Thompson is a 60-year-old former horse breeder who found his calling and career as The Cowboy Cupid.  His business is match making.  Specifically, introducing American men who are interested in finding love and marriage to Mexican women intent on the same.

For $3000 USD, Thompson will escort you to Mexico and upon arrival arrange introductions with eligible ladies.  The success rate is high.  But before the client is accepted and before a trip to Mexico can be made, the client must first pass Thompson's "smell test".

The film chronicles his attempts to set up three men. The first is a 48-year-old truck driver who lives on a mobile home next to his parents’ house, whom he successfully introduces to a 20-year-old seamstress from Torreón. They marry and have a child.  Another client is an American used car dealer who does not hit it off with a Mexican doctor.  The last is a toothless veteran who marries a Mexican laundress.  Finally Ivan quits the business and decides to go town to town in Mexico to pursue his own quest to find love.

Critical reception
Review aggregator website Metacritic gave the film a 57 out of 100, indicating "mixed or average reviews".

From Marrit Ingman of The Austin Chronicle:

From Elizabeth Weitzman of The New York Daily News:

The film was awarded Best Documentary Film at the 2005 South by Southwest Film Festival. The film was nominated for Best Documentary Screenplay from the Writers Guild of America.

References

External links 
 
 

2005 documentary films
2005 films
American documentary films
Films shot in Mexico
Films shot in New Mexico
Films shot in Texas
2000s Spanish-language films
2000s English-language films
Films directed by Michèle Ohayon
2000s American films